Falcon Lake is a Canadian-French drama film, directed by Charlotte Le Bon and slated for release in 2022. Adapted from the graphic novel Une sœur by Bastien Vivès, the film stars Joseph Engel as Bastien, a 13-year-old boy from Paris, France, on a family vacation in Quebec, where he meets and develops a relationship with Chloé (Sara Montpetit), the 16-year-old daughter of his mother's old friend Louise (Karine Gonthier-Hyndman).

The cast also includes Monia Chokri as Bastien's mother Violette, as well as Jeff Roop, Pierre-Luc Lafontaine, and Thomas Laperrière in supporting roles.

The film was shot in summer 2021 in and around Gore, Quebec.

The film debuted in the Director's Fortnight program at the 2022 Cannes Film Festival on May 18, 2022. It had its Canadian premiere at the 2022 Toronto International Film Festival.

Critical response
On the review aggregation website Rotten Tomatoes, Falcon Lake holds an approval rating of 100% based on 12 reviews from critics, with an average rating of 7.20/10.

Awards

References

External links

2022 films
Canadian coming-of-age drama films
French coming-of-age drama films
Films shot in Quebec
Films set in Quebec
Films based on French comics
Quebec films
2022 drama films
English-language Canadian films
French-language Canadian films
2020s Canadian films
2020s French films